Scott Harris is an American baseball executive. He is the president of baseball operations of the Detroit Tigers of Major League Baseball, after having previously served as general manager of the San Francisco Giants.

Early life and education
Harris is from Redwood City, California. He is the son of two doctors, one a urologist and one an OB-GYN, and has one brother, Chris, and one sister, K.C.

Harris attended Menlo School and played soccer and lacrosse in high school. He graduated from the University of California, Los Angeles (UCLA) in 2009 with a bachelor's degree in economics, and then attended Columbia Business School. Harris played club lacrosse at UCLA.

Career
Harris' first jobs in baseball were internships with the Washington Nationals and Cincinnati Reds. He worked for MLB from 2010 through 2012, in the Commissioner's Office as a coordinator of Major League Operations. In 2012, he joined the Chicago Cubs as director of baseball operations. He earned his Master of Business Administration from Northwestern University's Kellogg School of Management in 2015. He was promoted to assistant general manager in January 2018.

The Giants hired Harris as their general manager after the 2019 season.

On September 19, 2022, the Tigers hired Harris as their new president of baseball operations after having fired Al Avila a month prior.

References

1986 births
1987 births
Living people
Chicago Cubs executives
Detroit Tigers executives
Kellogg School of Management alumni
Major League Baseball executives
Major League Baseball general managers
People from Redwood City, California
San Francisco Giants executives
UCLA Bruins athletes
University of California, Los Angeles alumni